Marasmarcha cinnamomeus is a moth of the family Pterophoridae. It is found in the European part of Russia and Tajikistan.

References

Moths described in 1871
Exelastini